(10302) 1989 ML is an as yet unnamed near-Earth asteroid. It is approximately 0.6 km in diameter. An Amor asteroid, it orbits between Earth and Mars. It is an X-type asteroid, so its surface composition is yet unknown. It was discovered by Eleanor F. Helin and Jeff T. Alu at Palomar Observatory on 29 June 1989.

Targeting by spacecraft 
The delta-v ('effort') required to reach 1989 ML from a low-Earth orbit is only 4.8 km/s, ranking fifth (as of March 2007) amongst the near-Earth asteroids with well-established orbits. 1989 ML is thus particularly 'easy' (and 'cheap') to reach by spacecraft.

1989 ML was considered as a target of the Japanese spacecraft Hayabusa (then Muses-C) but had to be given up due to technical reasons. It was also considered by the European Space Agency as a candidate target for the Don Quijote mission to study the effects of impacting a spacecraft into an asteroid; however, they too changed to other targets.

See also 
 List of minor planets and comets visited by spacecraft

References

External links 
 Near-Earth asteroid Delta-v ranking, 1989 ML ranks fourth among the numbered asteroids
 
 
 

010302
Discoveries by Eleanor F. Helin
Discoveries by Jeff T. Alu
010302
19890629